Pyrrolines, also known under the name dihydropyrroles, are three different heterocyclic organic chemical compounds that differ in the position of the double bond. Pyrrolines are formally derived from the aromate pyrrole by hydrogenation. 1-Pyrroline is a cyclic imine, whereas 2-pyrroline and 3-pyrroline are cyclic amines.

Substituted pyrrolines 
Notable examples of pyrrolines containing various substituents include:
 2-Acetyl-1-pyrroline, an aroma compound with a white bread-like smell
 Thienamycin, a beta-lactam antibiotic
 MTSL, a chemical used for certain NMR experiments
 Pyrrolysine, an unusual proteinogenic amino acid
 1-Pyrroline-5-carboxylic acid, a biosynthetic metabolite
 Porphyrin, consisting of two alternating pairs of pyrrol and pyrroline connected via methine (=CH-) bridges
N-substituted pyrrolines can be generated by ring-closing metathesis.

See also 
 Pyrrole, the aromatic analog with two double bonds
 Pyrrolidine, the fully saturated analog without double bonds

References

External links 
 Pyrroline, 1-pyrroline, 2-pyrroline, and 3-pyrroline at EMBL-EBI